Maximucinus muirheadae is the largest known thylacinid species that lived in Queensland, Australia from the late Oligocene to the middle Miocene.
The species was a quadrupedal marsupial predator, that in appearance looked similar to a dog with a long snout. Its molar teeth were specialized for carnivory; the cups and crest were reduced or elongated to give the molars a cutting blade. It is estimated to have weighed about 18 kilograms.

The holotype and only specimen is a second upper molar found in Riversleigh. The species is named after Jeanette Muirhead because of her work on thylacinids.

Taxonomy 
The description was published in 2001 as a new species and genus, recognising greater diversity within the thylacinid family.
The author, palaeontologist Stephen W. Wroe, was one of several researchers who discovered over ten new fossil species of thylacinids, mostly from new material extracted from sites at the Riversleigh World Heritage Area.

Wroe distinguished the name of the new species by honouring fellow researcher Jeanette Muirhead, whose own works had described new genera and species of the family in the preceding decade. The genus name combines the Latin maximus, large, with kynos, the Ancient Greek word for dog.

Description 
Known only from a single specimen, an upper right M2 molar, Wroe estimated M. muirheadae's weight at 18 kilograms, the largest thylacinid discovered from the middle Miocene. The author used evidence of diversity and size range that emerged from research at Riversleigh, and other material from sites such as Alcoota, to produce new statistical analysis, calculated with regression functions, that showed multiple evolutionary lineages within the family.

References

External links
Natural Worlds
Muirheadae Data

Prehistoric thylacines
Prehistoric mammals of Australia
Oligocene marsupials
Tortonian genus extinctions
Miocene marsupials
Riversleigh fauna
Rupelian genus first appearances
Prehistoric marsupial genera